Dichomeris issikii is a moth in the family Gelechiidae. It was described by Okada in 1961. It is found in Korea and Japan.

References

Moths described in 1961
issikii